Lavender oil is an essential oil obtained by distillation from the flower spikes of certain species of lavender. There are over 400 types of lavender worldwide with different scents and qualities. Two forms of lavender oil are distinguished, lavender flower oil, a colorless oil, insoluble in water, having a density of 0.885 g/mL; and lavender spike oil, a distillate from the herb Lavandula latifolia, having a density of 0.905 g/mL. Like all essential oils, it is not a pure compound; it is a complex mixture of phytochemicals, including linalool and linalyl acetate.

Production
Pure lavender essential oil is produced through steam distillation. This generates a greater amount of oil compared to other methods due to reduction of polar compound loss. Harvest of lavender blooms is typically between late June and August. The cut lavender flowers and stems are compacted into a lavender still. A boiler is then used to steam the bottom of the lavender flower filled still at a very low pressure. The lavender flower pockets containing oil are broken from this heating process and a pipe of cold water is run through the center of the still. The hot lavender oil vapor condenses on the cold pipe with the cold water and is collected into a holding tank where it is allowed to settle. Due to polarity and densities of the water and oil, these two will separate in the holding tank whereupon the water is piped out, leaving just lavender essential oil.

Lavender oil is produced around the world, with Bulgaria, France and China leading its production.

Uses
In the United States, lavender oil is Generally Recognized as Safe (GRAS) for its intended uses. Lavender oil has been used as a perfume, aromatherapy, and skin application, but these uses have no clinical benefit. Lavender oil is used in massage therapy as a way of inducing relaxation through direct skin contact, although allergic reactions may occur. There is no good evidence to support the use of lavender oil for treating dementia. 

A 2021 meta-analysis included five studies of people with anxiety disorders. All five studies were funded by the manufacturers of the lavender oil capsule used, four of them were conducted by one author of the meta-analysis, and blinding was not clear. In this analysis, an oral 80 mg dose of lavender oil per day was associated with reduced anxiety scores on the Hamilton Anxiety Rating Scale. According to the National Center for Complementary and Integrative Health, the effectiveness of using oral lavender oil for treating anxiety remains undetermined due to the limitations of these studies.

Oil of spike lavender was used as a solvent in oil painting, mainly before the use of distilled turpentine became common.

Possible adverse effects
Many essential oils, including lavender oil, can be poisonous if swallowed. In general,  of a diluted essential oil may cause toxicity in adults, whereas  can be toxic in children. Over 2014-18 in New South Wales, there were 271 reported cases of lavender oil poisoning  mostly in children   accounting for 6.1% of all essential oil poisoning cases. The main toxic constituents of lavender oil are linalyl acetate and linalool.

Symptoms of lavender oil poisoning by ingestion include blurred vision, difficulty breathing, burning pain in the throat, burns to the eye, confusion, decreased level of consciousness, diarrhea, stomach pain, vomiting, and rash. Topical application of lavender oil may cause contact dermatitis.

Ingestion of lavender oil may cause interactions with prescription drugs, including anticoagulants, statins, and anticonvulsants.

Environmental impact 
A 2018 study by the National Institute of Environmental Health Sciences found four of the constituent chemicals (eucalyptol, 4-terpineol, limonene and alpha-terpineol) are endocrine disruptors, raising concerns of potential environmental health impact from the oil.

Phytochemicals

The phytochemical composition of lavender oil varies from species to species (table), consisting primarily of monoterpeneoid and sesquiterpeneoid alcohols. Linalool (20-35%) and linalyl acetate (30-55%) dominate, with moderate levels of lavandulyl acetate, terpinen-4-ol and lavandulol, 1,8-cineole, camphor, limonene, and tannins. Lavender oil typically contains more than 100 compounds, although many of these are at negligible concentrations.

The composition of lavender essential oil as obtained by chromatography:

References

Essential oils